Dr.Narayan Singh Bhati (1930 – 18 April 1994) was a  writer in Rajasthani language.

Works
He was the founder and director of Rajasthani Research Institute based at Chopasani Jodhpur since 1955 until 1993. He was deeply involved in preservation of old Rajasthani literature.

Awards
He was awarded by Sahitya Akademi, Delhi for his poetry Barsan Ra Degoda Dungar Langhiyan in 1981.  He was also awarded by the Rajasthan Sahitya Akademi's Prithviraj Prize.  He received the 
Padma Shri in the year 2010.

References

Recipients of the Sahitya Akademi Award in Rajasthani
1930 births
1994 deaths
Writers from Rajasthan
Rajasthani-language writers
People from Jodhpur district
20th-century Indian poets
20th-century Indian historians